The second season of the American legal comedy-drama Suits was ordered on August 11, 2011. The season originally aired on USA Network in the United States between June 14, 2012 and February 21, 2013.  The season was produced by Hypnotic Films & Television and Universal Cable Productions, and the executive producers were Doug Liman, David Bartis and series creator Aaron Korsh. The season had six series regulars playing employees at the fictional Pearson Hardman law firm in Manhattan: Gabriel Macht, Patrick J. Adams, Rick Hoffman, Meghan Markle, Sarah Rafferty, and Gina Torres.

Overview
The series revolves around corporate lawyer Harvey Specter and his associate attorney Mike Ross, the latter practicing without a law degree.

Cast

Regular cast
 Gabriel Macht as Harvey Specter
 Patrick J. Adams as Mike Ross
 Rick Hoffman as Louis Litt
 Meghan Markle as Rachel Zane
 Sarah Rafferty as Donna Paulsen
 Gina Torres as Jessica Pearson

Recurring cast
 Abigail Spencer as Dana Scott
 David Costabile as Daniel Hardman
 Eric Close as Travis Tanner

Guest cast
 Rebecca Schull as Edith Ross

Six actors received star billing in the show's first season. Each character works at the fictional Pearson Hardman law firm in Manhattan.  Gabriel Macht plays corporate lawyer Harvey Specter, who is promoted to senior partner and is forced to hire an associate attorney. Patrick J. Adams plays college dropout Mike Ross, who wins the associate position with his eidetic memory and genuine desire to be a good lawyer. Rick Hoffman plays Louis Litt, Harvey's jealous rival and the direct supervisor of the firm's first-year associates. Meghan Markle plays Rachel Zane, a paralegal who aspires to be an attorney but her test anxiety prevents her from attending Harvard Law School. Sarah Rafferty plays Donna Paulsen, Harvey's long-time legal secretary, confidant, and initially the only one at the firm who knows Mike never attended law school. Gina Torres plays Jessica Pearson, the co-founder and managing partner of the firm.

Episodes

Ratings

References

External links 
Suits episodes at USA Network
List of Suits season 1 episodes at Internet Movie Database

02
2012 American television seasons
2013 American television seasons